Victor Leonard William Mitchell (8 March 1925 – 6 January 1980) was a notable New Zealand artist and gallery owner. He was born in Palmerston North, New Zealand on 8 March 1925.

The Lower Hutt War Memorial Library in Lower Hutt houses three large, important works by Mitchell that are an integral part of the library's design.

References

1925 births
1980 deaths
People from Palmerston North
20th-century New Zealand artists
20th-century New Zealand male artists